Melissa "Missy" Keiser is an American wheelchair curler.

At the national level, she is a 2005 United States wheelchair curling champions curler.

Teams

References

External links 

Living people
American female curlers
American wheelchair curlers
Year of birth missing (living people)
Place of birth missing (living people)
21st-century American women